Ibrahim Youssef Al-Doy (born 22 January 1945) is a retired Bahraini football referee. He is known for having refereed one match in the 1982 FIFA World Cup in Spain, which was Hungary's record 10-1 win over El Salvador in Elche on 15 June 1982.

References
Profile

1945 births
Living people
Bahraini football referees
FIFA World Cup referees
1982 FIFA World Cup referees